After War Gundam X is a 1996 Japanese mecha drama anime series and the seventh incarnation to Sunrise's long-running Gundam franchise. It is directed by Shinji Takamatsu and written by Hiroyuki Kawasaki. It aired on TV Asahi from April 5, to December 28, 1996. From episodes 1–26, the first opening theme is "DREAMS" by Romantic Mode while the ending theme from episodes 1–13 is "HUMAN TOUCH" by Warren Wiebe and the second ending theme from episodes 14–26 is a Japanese version of "HUMAN TOUCH" by re-kiss. For episode 39, "HUMAN TOUCH" is the ending theme. Episode titles are taken from quotes spoken by characters in the series.

Episode list

References

After War Gundam X
X